Dick Lourie is an American poet and the author of eight books, with the most recent  being If the Delta was the Sea.

Career
In 1968, he signed the "Writers and Editors War Tax Protest" pledge, vowing to refuse tax payments in protest against the Vietnam War.

He has edited, along with Mark Pawlak, two anthologies of high school writing Smart Like Me and Bullseye. In 2000, he released a CD, Ghost Radio Blues, a mix of blues and spoken word. He formerly worked as an editor for the University of Massachusetts.
The movie Smoke Signals ends with his poem "Forgiving Our Fathers."

Biography
He currently resides in Somerville, Massachusetts, with his wife, Abby Freedman.

Bibliography
Ghost Radio. Hanging Loose (1998) 
If the Delta was the Sea. Hanging Loose (2008)

References

Living people
American male poets
American tax resisters
Poets from Massachusetts
Year of birth missing (living people)